Scott Spencer Storch (born December 16, 1973) is an American record producer and songwriter. He started off as a keyboardist for the group the Roots.

Early life
Storch was born on Long Island, New York. He was raised in South Florida and Philadelphia, Pennsylvania. His mother, Joyce Yolanda Storch, was a singer signed to Philadelphia's Cameo-Parkway Records under the stage name Joyce Carol, and is of Lithuanian Jewish heritage. His father, Phil Storch, was a court reporter. His uncle, Jeremy Storch, was a founder of soul-rock band the Vagrants and wrote songs recorded by Dave Mason and Eddie Money. Storch's parents divorced in 1983.

Storch attended elementary school in Sunrise and middle school in Davie, Florida. In the middle of his freshman year, he left South Florida to join his father in the Philadelphia area, and attended high school in Bensalem, Pennsylvania. After dropping out of high school in the ninth grade, Storch was expelled from home at the age of 16. By age 18, he was living with his father in Cherry Hill, New Jersey.

Some publications have written that Storch was born in Canada, but in 2010 the Miami New Times wrote a denial under the title "Scott Storch is not Canadian."

Career
Scott Storch began his professional music career in 1991, when he became one of the first members of the hip hop group the Roots as a keyboard player. He was heavily involved in the following two albums released by the Roots: Organix and Do You Want More?!!!??! and had involvement in Illadelph Halflife. Storch, however, had a distaste towards touring and preferred creating in the studio and decided upon becoming a music producer in his own right.

Storch's first two commercial hits were from the production on the track "You Got Me" by the Roots ft. Erykah Badu and Eve and his collaboration with Dr. Dre for the song "Still D.R.E.". He produced "Lean Back", a 2004 single by Terror Squad. He was one of the top producers in the business, having worked on hits by 50 Cent, the Game, T.I., Chris Brown, Christina Aguilera, Beyoncé, Dr. Dre, Nas, Snoop Dogg, Pink, Lil' Kim and many others. Storch was also awarded ASCAP's Songwriter of the Year award in 2006.

He produces hip hop music through his label, Storch Music Company. He also had his own music production company called Tuff Jew Productions LLC which is published by Reservoir Media Management.

Since filing for bankruptcy in 2015, he decided to focus on music and lay off drugs. Since then, he has worked with DJ Khaled, the Game, Berner, Russ, Bone Thugs-n-Harmony, Crim Dela Crim, and more.

Personal life
By 2006, Storch was worth more than $70 million. His son was born April 16, 2006, with his part-time girlfriend of seven years Dalene “Daedreams” Daniel. He picked up a cocaine addiction. In August 2006, he "took a month off" and vacationed in Hollywood, California. Friend and manager Derek Jackson said, "It was just a wonderful year, but I think it was defined by the magic month of August. He ran into the Hollywood class  and when he went to Hollywood, all things changed." He withdrew from producing and focused on partying with friends at his $10 million mansion in Palm Island, Florida. He also purchased a private jet, a 117-foot yacht, and nearly 20 luxury cars, about half of which he estimated he purchased while high on cocaine. Storch squandered $30 million in less than six months, and was in dire financial straits by January 2007.

In 2008, Storch hit legal trouble after reportedly falling behind on both his child-support payments and his property taxes. In early 2009, he was arrested for motor vehicle theft for allegedly failing to return a Bentley he had leased three years prior. In April 2009, Storch checked into an intensive inpatient rehab program in Hollywood, Florida, and filed for bankruptcy that May. In February 2012, Storch was arrested in Las Vegas, Nevada for possession of cocaine and was released on bail. On June 24, 2015, Storch officially filed for bankruptcy.

Production discography

References

1973 births
Living people
American hip hop record producers
American music industry executives
American people of Lithuanian-Jewish descent
American pop keyboardists
American pop pianists
American male pianists
American rhythm and blues keyboardists
Businesspeople from Florida
Businesspeople from New Jersey
Businesspeople from Pennsylvania
Interscope Records artists
Jewish American musicians
Musicians from Florida
Musicians from New Jersey
Musicians from New York (state)
Musicians from Philadelphia
Nova High School alumni
People from Davie, Florida
People from Bucks County, Pennsylvania
People from Cherry Hill, New Jersey
People from Long Island
The Roots members
Record producers from Pennsylvania
21st-century American keyboardists